Carlo Bordini (2 September 1938 – 10 November 2020) was an Italian poet. He was born in Rome. His poetry had been translated into Spanish, French, and Swedish.

Bordini died on 10 November 2020 at the age of 82.

Bibliography

Poetry 
 Strana categoria, Roma, Stampato in proprio, 1975.
 Poesie leggere, Siena, Barbablù, 1981.
 Strategia, Roma, Savelli, 1981.
 Pericolo, Reggio Emilia, Aelia Laelia, 1984.
 Mangiare, Roma, Empirìa, 1995.
 Polvere, Roma, Empirìa, 1999. A fragment in English: Dust.
 Purpureo nettare, Bergamo, Alla pasticceria del pesce, 2006.
 Sasso, Milano, Scheiwiller, 2008.
 Antologia: Pericolo, Poesie 1975-2001, San Cesario di Lecce, Manni, 2004.
 I costruttori di vulcani, Luca Sossella, Bologna, 2010.
 "New York" Italian original text and english version.

Prose 
 Manuale di autodistruzione, Roma, Fazi, 1998 (ristampato nel 2004). 
 Pezzi di ricambio, Roma, Empirìa, 2003. 
 Gustavo, una malattia mentale, Roma, Avagliano, 2006 (novel).
 Dal fondo, la poesia dei marginali, Rome, Savelli, 1978 (ristampato da Avagliano nel 2007). A cura di Carlo Bordini e Antonio Veneziani.
 Renault 4, Scrittori a Roma prima della morte di Moro, Roma, Avagliano, 2007. A cura di Carlo Bordini e Andrea di Consoli.
 Non è un gioco, appunti di viaggio sulla poesia in America Latina, Roma, Luca Sossella editore, 2008.

References

External links 
 Bordini's poems translated to English

1938 births
2020 deaths
20th-century Italian poets
Italian male poets
Writers from Rome
20th-century Italian male writers
21st-century Italian poets
21st-century Italian male writers